The 2010 Swedish Golf Tour, titled as the 2010 Nordea Tour for sponsorship reasons, was the 27th season of the Swedish Golf Tour.

All tournaments also featured on the 2010 Nordic Golf League.

Schedule
The following table lists official events during the 2010 season.

Order of Merit
The Order of Merit was titled as the Nordea Tour Ranking and was based on prize money won during the season, calculated using a points-based system.

See also
2010 Danish Golf Tour
2010 Finnish Tour
2010 Swedish Golf Tour (women)

Notes

References

Swedish Golf Tour
Swedish Golf Tour